was a Japanese politician who served as Prime Minister of Japan from 1987 to 1989 during the bubble economy.

Takeshita led the largest faction at the time in the Liberal Democratic Party, which he inherited from Kakuei Tanaka, from the 1980s until his death in 2000. He was dubbed the "last shadow shogun" for his behind-the-scenes influence in Japanese politics. He was the last prime minister to serve during the long rule of Emperor Shōwa. He is the grandfather of musician and actor Daigo.

Early life and education
Noboru Takeshita was born on 26 February 1924, in present-day Unnan, Shimane Prefecture, the son of a sake brewer. His family had been sake brewers for generations, and Takeshita was the 20th head of the Takeshita brewing family. Both his father Yūzō and his grandfather Gizō had been men of high repute in the region, and Takeshita followed in their footsteps and decided to become a politician when he was in middle school.

Takeshita attended Waseda University in Tokyo.

He married prior to joining the Imperial Japanese Army to serve as an instructor during World War II. His wife committed suicide while he was away for the war, which author Jacob Schlesinger argued made Takeshita obsessive about his composure and highly reserved about showing anger to others. 
 
After the war, he remarried, to Naoko, a distant relative, worked as an English teacher and managed a high school judo team before entering politics in 1951. As a young judo competitor, he was known as "master of the draw" for his ability to avoid easy victories over weaker opponents and to avert defeat by stronger opponents.

Political career

Takeshita served as a local assemblyman in Shimane Prefecture from 1951. In the 1958 general election he won a seat in the House of Representatives, joining the powerful faction of Kakuei Tanaka in the Liberal Democratic Party. He was elected at the same time as Shin Kanemaru, and the two remained close allies through their respective political careers. Takeshita eventually became Tanaka's primary fundraiser, traveling the country to garner support for the LDP's coffers. Like Tanaka, Takeshita was fond of "pork barrel" politics, retaining his own seat by bringing excessively huge public works projects to Shimane. Takeshita served as chief cabinet secretary from 1971 to 1974 and as minister of construction in 1976.

Takeshita was the minister of finance from 1979 to 1980, and he again accepted the finance position and was in office from 1982 to 1986. In this period, he achieved prominence as Japan's negotiator during deliberations which led to the agreement which is known as the Plaza Accord in New York. In the period Takeshita was finance minister, the Yen appreciated relative to other international currencies. The rise of the strong Yen (endaka) enhanced Japan's status as a financial powerhouse and led to the Japanese asset price bubble of the 1980s.

Kakuei Tanaka was arrested in connection with the Lockheed bribery scandals in 1976 and found guilty by a lower court in 1983, placing pressure on his political strength. In February 1985, Takeshita formed a "study group" called Soseikai, which counted among its ranks 43 of the 121 Tanaka faction members. Weeks after this defection, Tanaka suffered a stroke and became hospitalized, sparking further uncertainty over the future of his faction. Tanaka never recovered from his stroke, and by July 1987, Takeshita's faction counted 113 of the 143 Tanaka faction members, while only thirteen supported Takeshita's rival Susumu Nikaido. The Tanaka faction members who moved to Takeshita's faction included Ichiro Ozawa, Tsutomu Hata, Ryutaro Hashimoto, Keizo Obuchi and Kozo Watanabe.

In July 1986 Takeshita left the Cabinet and was named to the key post of secretary general of the party.

In November 1987, Takeshita became president of the LDP and was thus elected Prime Minister of Japan, replacing Yasuhiro Nakasone. Among the highlights of the period in which Takeshita led the government, he acknowledged that Japan had been an aggressor during World War II.  This statement was part of a speech in the Japanese Diet. Takeshita attended the third annual ASEAN summit in Manila in December 1987 and formalised a $2 billion development fund package in order to help stimulate ASEAN economies, continuing previous efforts at enhancing Japanese relations with East Asian countries. Takeshita also pursued diplomacy in the rest of the world, including tours of several western nations as well as discussions for debt forgiveness to developing countries. Takeshita's initial tenure was relatively comfortable due to steady success in the Japanese economy at the time, but soon his administration began to see some issues. The number of unskilled foreign workers (from areas such as the Philippines and Bangladesh) doubled between 1986 and 1988, and the American government passed into law the Omnibus Trade Bill, which threatened Japanese exports to the country. Moreover, despite Takeshita diplomatic gestures, trade imbalance with both Western Europe and East Asia continued to widen, leading to friction between the Japanese and foreign governments.

However, he was mainly remembered within Japan for implementing the country's first consumption tax, which his government forced through the Diet in 1988 amid public opposition. Takeshita's government also passed legislation liberalizing the beef, citrus and rice markets, and passed an enhanced security pact with the United States, with the support of Shin Kanemaru who bought the opposition's support.

The Recruit scandal forced Takeshita to resign in 1989.

Later years and death
Although Takeshita was accused of insider trading and corruption, he was never charged and was able to retain his seat in the Diet until shortly before his death. He remained a major behind-the-scenes player in the LDP, mentoring future prime ministers Sōsuke Uno, Toshiki Kaifu, and Keizō Obuchi. Tsutomu Hata and Ichiro Ozawa left Takeshita's faction to form the Japan Renewal Party. Keizo Obuchi inherited what was left of the faction, supported the election of Ryutaro Hashimoto as prime minister, and himself became prime minister from 1999 to 2000; he died of a stroke in early 2000 and Hashimoto took over control of the faction.

Takeshita himself died of respiratory failure in June 2000 after over a year in hospital, during which time he was said to have "masterminded" the coalition between the LDP and New Komeito and to have arranged the election of Prime Minister Yoshiro Mori from his hospital bed. He had planned to retire from the Diet as of the 2000 general election, which occurred just days after his death. The Economist characterized his death as the end of an era that was "a dizzy mixture of brilliance and corruption" in Japanese politics.

Hashimoto led the former Takeshita faction until refusing to stand in the 2005 general election due to a fundraising scandal, and died shortly thereafter. The remnants of the faction, formally known by this time as Heisei Kenkyūkai (Heisei Research Council), remained active under the leadership of Yūji Tsushima, who resigned prior to the 2009 general election, passing control to Fukushiro Nukaga. The faction raised much less in donations during the 1990s and 2000s than it did under Tanaka and Takeshita in the 1980s, as electoral reforms enacted in 1994, coupled with new campaign finance regulations and the ongoing economic slump that followed the Japanese asset price bubble, weakened the power of factions in Japanese politics.

Personal life 
Takeshita was twice married, and survived by three daughters and several grandchildren, including singer Daigo (formerly known as Daigo☆Stardust) and manga artist Eiki Eiki.

His younger brother, Wataru Takeshita (born 1946) was a reporter with NHK, then began working for Noboru as an aide in 1985. Wataru entered politics in 2000 and served as leader of his old Takeshita faction (now known as the Heisei Kenkyūkai faction) from 2018 until his death in September 2021.

Honours
 Grand Cordon of the Order of the Chrysanthemum (20 June 2000; posthumous)
 Golden Pheasant Award of the Scout Association of Japan (1991)

External links

References 

|-

|-

|-

|-

|-

|-

Prime Ministers of Japan
1924 births
2000 deaths
20th-century prime ministers of Japan
Japanese Buddhists
Waseda University alumni
Liberal Democratic Party (Japan) politicians
Ministers of Finance of Japan
Ministers of Construction of Japan
People from Shimane Prefecture
20th-century Japanese politicians
Imperial Japanese Army personnel of World War II
Politicians from Shimane Prefecture
Imperial Japanese Army soldiers